Lyons School District 103 (SD103) is a school district headquartered in Lyons, Illinois.

Schools
Middle school:
 George Washington Middle School (Lyons)
Elementary schools:
 Costello Elementary School (Lyons)
 Edison Elementary School (Stickney)
 Home Elementary School (Stickney)
 Lincoln Elementary School (Brookfield)
 Robinson Elementary School (Lyons)

References

External links
 

School districts in Cook County, Illinois
Brookfield, Illinois